The  DTC may refer to:

Places
Desert Training Center, a World War II training area located mostly in southwestern California and western Arizona
 Downtown Transit Center (TC), San Joaquin Regional Transit District
Denver Technological Center, a business park in Denver and Greenwood Village, Colorado

Companies and organizations
Developmental Test Command, a component of the United States Army
Defence Technology Centres, British military research facilities
Delhi Transport Corporation, the bus transport provider in Delhi
Depository Trust Company, American securities depository, subsidiary of Depository Trust & Clearing Corporation (DTCC)
Diamond Trading Company, rough diamonds sales and distribution arm of De Beers
Digital Trust Center, Dutch organisation and platform with the aim to help businesses with digital matters
Doctoral Training Centres, British centres for managing PhD studies
Discount Tire Company, an American tire and wheel retailer

Software
Direct-threaded code, a compiler implementation technique.
Distributed Transaction Coordinator, in Microsoft Servers for a subsystem concerned with atomic transactions across multiple datastores
Domain Technologie Control, a Web-based control panel for admin and accounting for hosting web and e-mail services
Diagnostic Trouble Code, in the automotive industry, codes that are prescribed by SAE standards to help track problems in a vehicle detected by its on-board computer

Sports
Danish Touring Car Championship, Danish touring car racing series
Deutsche Tourenwagen Cup, a former German touring car racing series

Business methods and techniques
Design-to-cost, a cost management technique
Direct-to-consumer, business model focusing on e-commerce of a single product category
 Direct to Consumer (Retail), describes the sales channel where the original equipment manufacturer sells directly to the consumer (instead of using wholesale channel)
Direct-to-consumer advertising, the term for sale of goods without intermediary third parties

Arts and entertainment
 DTC: Yukemuri Junjo Hen from High & Low, 2018 Japanese film
 High&Low: The DTC, 2017 Japanese streaming show

Tax
Direct Taxes Code, changes in tax slabs
Disability Tax Credit, Canadian benefit

Science
Dithiocarbamate, a chemical
d-tubocurare, a neuromuscular blocking agent
Digital-to-time converter (a.k.a. digital delay generator), an electronic circuit or piece of equipment that generates precise delays defined by a digital control signal
Digitally tuned capacitor, a type of electrical capacitor whose capacitance can be changed by means of a digital control signal
Direct Torque Control, a method to control electric motors with very good torque dynamics
Direct traffic control, a method of authorizing track occupancy on American railroads
Dynamic Traction Control, a system that controls a car's traction according to many conditions

Other
dtc (trigraph), in linguistics

See also

 
 .510 DTC EUROP bullet